Jean-Paul Clébert (born 23 February 192621 September 2011) was a French writer.

Biography

Before completing his studies in a Jesuit college, Jean-Paul Clébert left to join the French Resistance in 1943 at the age of 16. After the liberation, he spent six months in Asia and then returned to France. He described his unusual life:

On returning he lived for 3 or 4 years as a clochard amongst the many homeless people in the underground world of Paris. This experience inspired his classic study of the underworld of Paris Paris insolite/Unknown Paris (1952), which he dedicated to his companions Robert Giraud and photographer Robert Doisneau. The book was championed by the remaining Surrealists, and the emerging Situationists based their theory of the dérive on Clébert's principles, using his book as a literal guide to the underside of the city. An illustrated edition with photos of Patrice Molinard (who debuted as a stills photographer on Georges Franju's documentary le Sang des bêtes) and layout by Massin was published in 1954. On the occasion of the book's reissue by Attila in 2009 he said:

Clébert’s friends Jacques Yonnet and Robert Giraud were inspired to write their own tales of the vagabond life on the streets of Paris; Yonnet’s Rue des Maléfices (1954), his sole novel (originally Enchantements sur Paris, English translation  Paris Noir), and Giraud’s Le Vin des rues (1955). The three frequented Chez Fraysse on Rue de Seine in Saint-Germain-des-Prés with Doisneau, not far from Clébert’s other haunt Chez Moineau, the dirt-cheap refuge of bohemian youths and of Guy Debord, Michele Bernstein, Gil J. Wolman, Ivan Chtcheglov and the other members of the Lettrist International, and which was the subject of Ed van der Elsken’s photo-romain Love on the Left Bank (1956). Thus did Clébert attend both the last Surrealist meeting and some of the first gatherings of the Situationists.

For two years he was a reporter in Asia for Paris Match and France Soir.

Provence and later life 
Clébert retreated from urban life in 1956 to the mountainous Luberon region of Provence, in which he discovered abandoned stone villages, and took up residence there without running water or electricity, before moving in 1968 to Oppède-le-Vieux. The village had been a refuge for artists during the war, where Alexey Brodovitch owned an old mill occupied by his brother, and where Consuelo de Saint-Exupéry, widow of the aviator, was still resident. He spent the rest of his life there, dying on September 20, 2011.

He wrote thirty-three books and many were dedicated to the history and legends of his adopted Provence, the most influential of these being Les Tziganes (1962), a pioneering sociological study of Gypsies, one of the finest studies of the subject at the time based on both archival research and personal experience (although it has also seen criticism in recent years). The book was translated into English by Charles Duff in 1969. It was followed by Rêver de Provence – Côte d'Azur (1967), Guide de la Provence mystérieuse (1992) and a three volumes of the series Provence antique (vol. 1 in 1966, vol. 2 in 1970 and vol. 3 in 1992). He was awarded the Prix littéraire de Provence in 1988.

He published the novels L'Ermite in 1984, L'Alchimiste du Roi-Soleil in 1994 and L'Esprit des hauts lieux, in 2000. In 1996 he published Dictionnaire du Surréalisme.

Bibliography

 1952 : , co-authored with Patrice Molinard (photographs), Reissued by Attila in 2009 
 1953 : 
 1955 : 
 1956 : 
 1958 : , co-author: Georges Glasberg, Pub. Éditions Grasset 
 1962 : , illustrated by 64 photographs, 18 drawings and 2 maps 
 1966 : , 1 : des origines a la conquête romaine 
 1967 : 
 1968 : {{cite book  |title=Histoire et guide de la France secrète, co-author Aimé Michel, Encyclopédieplanéte |asin=B0000DSMJN}}
 1970 : 
 1981 : 
 1984 : 
 1986 : 
 1986 : 
 1988 : 
 1992 : 
 1992 : 
 1992 : 
 1993 : 
 1994 : 
 1995 : 
 1996 : 
 1996 : 
 1996 : 
 1998 : 
 1998 : 
 1999 : 
 2000 :  genre=roman
 2001 :  co-author Josiane Aoun and Béatrice Tollu, Aubanel : collection Nature Cote Sud 
 2003 : 
 2004 : 
 2006 : 
 2007 : 

Works in translation

 1956 :  The Paris I Love Text by Jean-Paul Clebert with photography by Patrice Molinard, with an introduction by Marcel Ayme, Tudor Publishing Company, New York
 1958 :  The Blockhouse, Avon Books
 1963 :  The Gypsies, Vista Books  translated by Charles Duff
 1997 :  Der Untergang der Welt, Pub. Lübbe
 2016 :   Paris Vagabond (Paris insolite) Donald Nicholson-Smith (translator), with photography by Patrice Molinard, New York Review Books. .

Works in adaptation
In 1973, The Blockhouse, was made into a film, directed by Clive Rees, and starred Peter Sellers and Charles Aznavour.

Notes

External linksLa mort de Jean-Paul Clébert, By Gregory Leménager, BibliObs http://bibliobs.nouvelobs.com/actualites/20110921.OBS0833/la-mort-de-jean-paul-clebert.html
Interview with Jean-Paul Clébert by Olivier Bailly, BibliObs «Les clochards n'étaient pas des exclus comme aujourd'hui» 31 October 2009 https://web.archive.org/web/20130321032804/http://bibliobs.nouvelobs.com/documents/20091031.BIB4327/les-clochards-n-039-etaient-pas-des-exclus-comme-aujourd-039-hui.html
 Le Vagabond de Paris'', BibliObs, http://bibliobs.nouvelobs.com/documents/20091030.BIB4325/le-vagabond-de-paris.html

1926 births
2011 deaths
20th-century French writers
French Resistance members
21st-century French writers
French journalists
Writers from Paris
20th-century French male writers
French male non-fiction writers